Manuel González Simón (born 4 August 2002) is a Spanish Grand Prix motorcycle racer competing in the Moto2 World Championship for the Yamaha VR46 Master Camp Team.

Career statistics

Supersport 300 World Championship

Races by year
(key) (Races in bold indicate pole position; races in italics indicate fastest lap)

Grand Prix motorcycle racing

By season

By class

Races by year
(key) (Races in bold indicate pole position; races in italics indicate fastest lap)

References

External links

2002 births
Living people
Spanish motorcycle racers
Supersport 300 World Championship riders
Moto2 World Championship riders